Uladzimir Khilkevich (born 31 October 1987) is a Belarusian professional footballer who plays for Gorki.

External links

1987 births
Living people
People from Mogilev
Sportspeople from Mogilev Region
Belarusian footballers
Association football midfielders
FC Naftan Novopolotsk players
FC Savit Mogilev players
FC Slavia Mozyr players
FC Belshina Bobruisk players
FC Spartak Shklov players
FC Dnepr Mogilev players
FC Orsha players
FC Gorki players